Jan Such (born 8 February 1948) is a Polish former volleyball player and coach. He competed in the men's tournament at the 1972 Summer Olympics.

References

External links
 

1948 births
Living people
People from Krosno County
Polish men's volleyball players
Polish volleyball coaches
Olympic volleyball players of Poland
Volleyball players at the 1972 Summer Olympics
Resovia (volleyball) players
Resovia (volleyball) coaches
ZAKSA Kędzierzyn-Koźle coaches
Jastrzębski Węgiel coaches